Cottendorfia is a genus of plants in the family Bromeliaceae. The genus name is for Johann Georg Freiherr Cotta von Cottendorf, German patron of the sciences (1796-1863).

There is only one known species,  Cottendorfia florida, endemic to northeastern Brazil (Bahia and Piauí).

References

External links
BSI Genera Gallery photos

Navioideae
Monotypic Poales genera
Endemic flora of Brazil
Bromeliaceae genera